Colchicum parnassicum is a plant species endemic to the Sterea Ellada region of central Greece. It is closely related to Colchicum autumnale, mainly being different in having shorter flowers.  The blooms are produced in fall and have a medium pink colour. The flowers hold up well in fall weather.  This species, if cultivated in cold climates, it will do better in a sunny, sheltered location.

References

parnassicum
Plants described in 1859
Flora of Greece